List of Bengali films of 2021 may refer to—
 List of Bangladeshi films of 2021, films released in Bangladesh in 2021
 List of Indian Bengali films of 2021, films released in West Bengal, India in 2021